Bulatlat is a Philippine independent online alternative news outlet. It was established in 2001. It is owned by the Alipato Media Center, Inc. Bulatlat was the recipient of the Center for Media Freedom and Responsibility Award of Distinction in 2022.

The National Telecommunications Commission (NTC) issued an order in June 2022 for internet service providers to block access to 26 websites, including that of Bulatlat alleging the sites to be "affiliated to and are supporting” the Communist Party of the Philippines, New People's Army and the National Democratic Front (CPP–NPA–NDF). A Quezon City regional trial court issued an injunction in August 2022 ordering the NTC to unblock Bulatlat's website, citing the news website's rights to be protected by the Constitutional provision on freedom of speech and of the press. The court later rejected the NTC's plea for reconsideration, reiterating that Bulatlat’s constitutional rights were violated when its website was blocked.

See also 

 Censorship in the Philippines

References

2001 establishments in the Philippines
Philippine news websites